Multi-National Division Baghdad (MND-B) was a division of Multi-National Force Iraq.

It was headquartered by the 1st Cavalry Division, based at Camp Victory (primary component of the Victory Base Complex), north of Baghdad International Airport.  The division controlled those brigades in greater Baghdad that are responsible for areas within the city itself. Of the brigades controlled by the 1st Cavalry Division, one was north of the city at Taji, one was in the northeastern part in Adhamiya, one at Camp Liberty in the west, one in the "International Zone" or "Green Zone" at the heart of the city, one on the southern outskirts, and a sixth in the southeast near Rasheed airfield. Following the Iraq War troop surge of 2007, most of the brigades' troops were dispersed at battalion- and company-level "combat outposts" and "joint security stations."  The headquarters of MND-B was previously provided by HQ 1st Armored Division (2003–2004), HQ 1st Cavalry Division (2004–2005), HQ 3rd Infantry Division (2005), 4th Infantry Division (2006 & 2008–2009) and 1st Cavalry Division (2007).

References

See also
 Iraq War order of battle 2009

Multinational force involved in the Iraq War
Military units and formations established in the 2000s